Ramón Cabrera may refer to:

Ramón Cabrera, 1st Duke of Maestrazgo (1806–1877), Carlist general of Catalonia
Ramón Cabrera (baseball) (born 1989), Venezuelan baseball catcher
Ramón Cabrera (athlete) (born 1938), Argentine long-distance runner